Arthur Radford Smith (born 4 February 1915, date of death unknown) was a British fencer. He competed in the individual and team foil events at the 1948 Summer Olympics. In 1948, he won the foil title at the British Fencing Championships.

References

External links
 

1915 births
Year of death missing
British male fencers
Olympic fencers of Great Britain
Fencers at the 1948 Summer Olympics